Samaritan Residential School is a co-educational boarding school in Elagiri Hills, Tamil Nadu, South India, providing education for students from all over India, Nepal and several other countries from around the world. The school is promoted and run by the Samaritan Educational Trust, Chennai. The management of the school consists of the Founder-Correspondent of the SBOA Schools of Chennai and other eminent educational consultants.

History
Formerly known as the Yelagiri Matriculation and Higher Secondary School, it was established in 1984 and managed by the Yelagiri Educational Trust. The school was taken over in 1994 by the Samaritan Educational Trust and renamed as the Samaritan Matriculation and Higher Secondary School. Since then, the management of the school has been divided for decentralised administration. Now known as the Samaritan Residential School, the school is divided into the Samaritan Public School, Matriculation and Higher Secondary divisions.

Education
The school is recognised by the Education Board of the Government of Tamil Nadu and sends its students for the Matriculation Examination in Class 10 and the Higher Secondary Certificate (HSC) in Class 12.

The school also offers CBSE for classes KG - Class 8 for the academic year starting in 2010.

The Academic year for the school starts in the first week of June and ends in the second week of April. With small breaks during September–October and December–January, the school closes for summer in March–April.

Location
With pleasant temperatures ranging between 15 °C and 30 °C, the  school campus is a beautiful setting with trees-filled fields and gardens.

The school is nestled away from the hustle and bustle of city life, with quiet and peaceful surroundings provided by its closeness to the reserve forests of the Eastern Ghats.

The nearest airports are located at Chennai, 250 km away, and Bangalore, 100 km away.  The school is well connected by road and rail with trains from all over India. The closest railway station is Jolarpet.

Campus
The main campus accommodates both the school buildings and classrooms and also the separate hostels for small children, boys and girls are close by to provide easy access to the school. The administrative office is at the entrance to the school and is open to visitors, parents and guests.

A spacious sports field separates the office from the school buildings which are separate according to the different grade levels. The hostels for the boys is close to the school buildings and the hostels for the girls and small children are provided more seclusion and safety. More than 75% of the staff are housed on the campus and strategically located on campus to provide maximum supervision.

Hostels
 Sadhu Sunder Singh Hostel (Boys)
 Abraham Lincoln Hostel (Boys)
 Pandita Ramabai Hostel (Girls)
 Mother Teresa Hostel (Children)

Founder 
E.A.G Moses founded Samaritan Schools in 1984. His 4 sons Neville, Rufus, Timothy and Barnabas and wife Helen Moses helped run the school.

Student body 
The school has a diverse and cosmopolitan student body represented from several states in India as well as students from other countries. Some of the states of India include Tamil Nadu, Karnataka, Kerala, Andhra Pradesh, Bihar, Mizoram, Manipur, Nagaland, Delhi, West Bengal and others. Students are also represented from neighbouring countries like Nepal and Sri Lanka as well as others like Kuwait, South Korea, Thailand and the United States among others. The school also provides education to local tribal children of Elagiri Hills.

House Teams
The school has six house teams which provides students an opportunity to compete and engage in sports, games, cultural competitions and events. The public school, which comprises the lower classes from KG to Class 5, has the Rajiv Gandhi House and the Martin Luther King Jr. House. The higher classes have four houses - William Carey, Ida Scudder, George Muller and Amy Carmichael.

Sports Facilities
 Volleyball Court
 Tennis Court
 Basketball Court
 Football & Athletics Sports Field
 Badminton Court

Curricular Activities

IGNOU Certificate Courses
The school has announced a collaboration with the Samaritan Community College, certified by the Indira Gandhi National Open University. Both the school and the college are promoted and managed by the Samaritan Educational Trust, a charitable non-profit trust based in Chennai. Students will be able to take 6 month certificate courses through the college and certificates will be issued by IGNOU. Selected courses relevant to student education will be offered.

References

 Society of Automotive Engineers INDIA
 TripsGuru.com

Christian schools in Tamil Nadu
Boarding schools in Tamil Nadu
Primary schools in Tamil Nadu
High schools and secondary schools in Tamil Nadu
Schools in Vellore district
Educational institutions established in 1984
1984 establishments in Tamil Nadu